The Roosevelt Avenue Historic District is located in Eau Claire, Wisconsin, United States. It was added to the National Register of Historic Places in 2009. Contributing buildings in the district were constructed from 1929 to 1941.

References

Eau Claire, Wisconsin
Houses on the National Register of Historic Places in Wisconsin
Houses in Eau Claire County, Wisconsin
Historic districts on the National Register of Historic Places in Wisconsin
National Register of Historic Places in Eau Claire County, Wisconsin